F. orientalis  may refer to:
 Fagus orientalis, the Oriental beech, a deciduous tree species found from northwest Turkey east to the Caucasus and Alborz Mountains
 Fritillaria orientalis, a monocotyledon plant species
 Fuchsia orientalis, a plant species endemic to Ecuador

See also
 Orientalis (disambiguation)